Lee Hawse Patteson (1902–1955) was the wife of former Governor of West Virginia Okey L. Patteson and served as that state's First Lady, 1949-1953.  She was born May 28, 1902 at Romney, West Virginia.  She married Okey L. Patteson in 1923.  As first lady, she entertained guests and began the tradition of decorating the trees around the West Virginia Governor's Mansion for the holidays.  She also obtained a pilot's license while serving as first lady.  She died in Mt. Hope, West Virginia on August 2, 1955.

References

1902 births
1955 deaths
Aviators from West Virginia
Women aviators
First Ladies and Gentlemen of West Virginia
People from Romney, West Virginia
20th-century American women
20th-century American people